Gary Solomon (born 26 June 1944) is a New Zealand cricketer. He played in two first-class matches for Wellington in 1966/67.

See also
 List of Wellington representative cricketers

References

External links
 

1944 births
Living people
New Zealand cricketers
Wellington cricketers
Cricketers from Lower Hutt